SAFPU may refer to:

 Singapore Armed Forces Provost Unit, former name of the Singapore Armed Forces Military Police Command
 South African Football Players Union